Bruiser is a 2000 French horror-thriller film written and directed by George A. Romero and starring Jason Flemyng, Peter Stormare and Leslie Hope. Bruiser was filmed in Toronto.

Plot 
Henry Creedlow who works as a creative director for a successful magazine firm lives an unhappy life; his high-strung, contemptuous wife Janine is indifferent to him which leads to him having fantasies about suicide. Henry meets with his best friend, Jimmy Larson to go to work downtown. While trying to board a train, an unsettled Henry fantasies about killing a woman who pushes him.

Henry works at a local magazine company called Bruiser. While at the office, everyone is at a conference meeting deciding on which model should be on the magazine's latest issue. The sleazy and reprehensible boss, Milo Styles, mocks Henry's choice in front of him and his co-workers.

That Saturday, there is a party for the workers at Milo and his wife Rosie's house. Henry has a plaster mold of his face made by Rosie, who designs masks in her spare time. Rosie finishes the mask and adds it to her "garden of lost souls" in the backyard. She asks Henry to paint a design on the featureless mask, but Henry cannot think of anything to draw. Henry sees Milo and Janine across the pool in a very intimate moment.

While driving home later that evening, Henry confronts Janine about what he saw. Janine hardly seems to care and she tells the distraught Henry that he is so weak-willed and a pushover. When they arrive home, Henry has another fantasy about killing Janine.

Henry wakes up the next morning, and is shocked when he sees that his entire face has transformed into a white, featureless mask. When Henry tries removing it he cuts himself. Henry hides when Katie, his once-a-week maid, arrives to clean the house. Henry watches the maid as she fills her bag with silver and other items from his house. Henry reveals himself and confronts her about stealing from him. Henry attacks and beats her to death with the bag filled with stolen silver items.

Henry follows his wife to the office and spots her and Milo having sex. Rosie bursts into the conference room and photographers them. When Milo chases his wife out of the building where Rosie tells Milo that she intends to leave him, Henry sneaks into the conference room where he reveals his new blank face to his wife. He wraps an extension cord around her neck and pushes her out a window where she hangs to death.

Milo gives a statement to Detective McCleary, Henry eludes the police and goes home. He hides from the cops again when they come to his front door to look for him to deliver the news of his wife's murder. After making it appear that he possibly killed himself.

That afternoon, Henry visits Jimmy where he points a gun at Jimmy and reveals the business account papers which show that Jimmy has been pilfering money out of Henry's bank accounts and mutual funds for two years now. Jimmy tells Henry that it was Janine's idea to steal Henry's money so she could squander it for herself. Jimmy reveals that Janine has been cheating on Henry with him too. Jimmy suddenly pulls out a gun from his briefcase and tries to kill Henry. Henry fires back, fatally wounding Jimmy in the chest.

Henry calls 'The Larry Case Show', a popular radio program, and tells the host that he is 'Faceless' and has murdered three people. After listening to some advice by Larry Case, Henry decides that he needs to eradicate all the people from his life who wronged and betrayed him if he is to get his face back.

Henry goes attends Milo's Halloween costume party, dressed as Zorro wearing a black cape along with his white mask. Rosie is also there who is being tailed by Detective McCleary, who thinks that she either killed Janine or had it done. Henry assembles a group of men from the office where they lure Milo to a second floor balcony where Henry tells his mean and ungrateful boss that he has set him up for a "grand finale". Milo is raised overhead on wires, Henry aims a strong laser at Milo (intended for exploding the heads of confetti-filled dummies), and kills him. As Henry walks away, he removes his black cape costume and hat, and his face returns to normal. He is also spotted by Detective McCleary who moves in to apprehend him. However, Rosie shows up in a Zorro costume with a white mask on and yells at McCleary that she is the killer. Henry bids Rosie farewell and escapes into the crowd.

Some years later, a long-haired Henry is now working as an office messenger in another city. Henry passes by an office where an angry and loathsome executive is yelling at several people. After the man screams at Henry who walks by, he turns around... and his blank, anonymous, faceless white mask has returned.

Cast

Soundtrack 
The score was composed by Donald Rubinstein and the soundtrack features the horror punk band The Misfits.

Release 
The film premiered on 13 February 2000 in Canada and was directly released to DVD in the United States on 9 October 2001.

Reception

Critical reception for Bruiser has been mixed to positive.

References

External links 
 
 
 

2000 films
2000 independent films
2000 horror films
2000 psychological thriller films
Films directed by George A. Romero
Films shot in Toronto
French psychological thriller films
2000s Spanish-language films
French independent films
StudioCanal films
English-language French films
2010s English-language films
Spanish-language French films
2000 multilingual films
French multilingual films
2000s French films
2010s French films